Staci Ann Gruber is an Associate Professor of Psychiatry at Harvard Medical School and Director of the Cognitive and Clinical Neuroimaging Core (CCNC) and the Marijuana Investigation for Neuroscientific Discovery (MIND) Program. She is known for her work examining substance use and psychiatric conditions using advanced neuroimaging techniques and measures of cognitive performance.

Education and career 
In 1991 Gruber received both a B.S. from Tufts University and a B.Mus. from the New England Conservatory of Music. In 1995 she earned an Ed.M. from Harvard Graduate School of Education. She received an M.S. from Tufts University in 2000, and in 2002 went on to earn her Ph.D. from Tufts University where she explored the Stroop effect and differential response of subregions within the cingulate cortex in patients with schizophrenia and bipolar disorder using functional MRI. As of 2022 she is an Associate Professor of Psychiatry at Harvard Medical School and the director of the Marijuana Investigations for Neuroscientific Discovery (MIND) Program at McLean Hospital.

Research 
Her current research is dedicated to examining the impact of cannabis and cannabinoids on various health outcomes using comprehensive an longitudinal clinical ratings, cognitive assessments, and magnetic resonance imaging (MRI) techniques, including functional magnetic resonance imaging (fMRI), diffusion tensor imaging (DTI), and magnetic resonance spectroscopy (MRS). Her research is funded and supported by government grants, philanthropy/private donations, and industry.

Dr. Gruber’s earlier work focused on the application of neurocognitive models and brain imaging to better characterize neurobiological risk factors for psychopathology; she is a co-author on some of the first published findings in patients with psychotic disorders using proton MRS and fMRI techniques. Her work in cannabis initially focused on clarifying the impact of age of onset of recreational cannabis use. Her findings demonstrated that individuals who began using cannabis earlier exhibit poorer performance on measures on cognitive performance and altered patterns of brain structure and function relative to those who began using cannabis later and relative to those who do not use cannabis. In 2014, she founded the Marijuana Investigations for Neuroscientific Discovery (MIND) program which is specifically focused on examining the specific effects of medical cannabis use. MIND examines the impact of medical cannabis using observational, longitudinal, and survey studies, as well as clinical trials of cannabinoid-based products. The Women’s Health Initiative at MIND (WHIM), a cannabis-focused women’s health research program, conducts studies related to sexual/reproductive health and disorders that disproportionately affect women as well as some transgender and non-binary individuals.

In 2017, Gruber stated that with regard to cannabis, "policy has outpaced science". Some of her research is conducted with private funding due to the federal government's placement of cannabis in Schedule I, having no accepted medical use. Gruber testified before the United States Congress in 2019 as an expert on the psychiatric effects of cannabis; her appearance was said by a cannabis industry newspaper to have provided the "most persuasive and thoughtful testimony" in the hearing, titled "Marijuana and America’s Health: Questions and Issues for Policy Makers". Gruber is an advisor to the Coalition for Cannabis Policy, Education, and Regulation, formed in 2021.

Selected publications

Personal life
Gruber and her spouse Patricia Cornwell live in Massachusetts. They wed in 2006. Gruber is Jewish. She is a singer, and recorded 1 album .

References

Further reading
https://www.wgbh.org/events/cannabis-conversations-investigating-medicinal-uses-of-cannabis-virtual
https://www.painnewsnetwork.org/stories/2021/4/10/harvard-study-finds-cannabis-effective-treatment-for-chronic-pain
https://www.mcleanhospital.org/news/mclean-hospital-study-finds-medical-marijuana-use-may-improve-cognitive-performance

External links 
 

Cannabis researchers
Harvard Medical School faculty
Living people
Tufts University alumni
Harvard University alumni
New England Conservatory alumni
Year of birth missing (living people)